Golden Films is an American production studio founded in 1994 by Diane Eskenazi, previously known as American Film Investment Corporation. The studio has produced a variety of animated films. The company's most notorious films were part of the Enchanted Tales series, which were originally distributed by Sony Wonder.

Golden Films became infamous for its Enchanted Tales films based on classic and original stories. This prompted The Walt Disney Company to sue one of Golden Films' distributors after a string of Disney Renaissance-era films ended up in direct competition with Golden Films' less expensive productions on the home video market. As both Disney and Golden Films had relied on the same public domain source material, Disney ultimately lost the case. The Golden Films library also used classical music.

Works
Golden Films has produced over 80 films and series many of which are based on stories that are in the public domain, as well as many original stories.

Golden Films has recently produced the "One World" series as well as "Call For Peace" (2021).  These films have won over 20 International Awards.   They feature over 100 Ambassadors from over 40 Countries around the world with an emphasis on Diversity and Inclusion (https://www.oneworldseries.com/).  In addition, Golden Films has produced "We Rise" (2022) a feature film to help young people cope with depression, stress and anxiety.   Golden Films is in pre-production on "Get Up and Dance" a new series.

Distribution 
Golden Films' productions have been distributed by a variety of distributors. In the United States, distributors have included Sony Wonder, Hallmark, and Cinedigm. International distributors include BBC, Universal, Grupo Planeta and Polygram. Current distribution includes Amazon, Tubi, Pluto TV, Comcast, Apple TV, Redbox, Roku Apple TV and many other streaming platforms.

References

https://oscars.einnews.com/pr_news/556146391/international-award-winning-tv-and-web-series-one-world-launches-december-1-2021

https://world.einnews.com/pr_news/556146391/international-award-winning-tv-and-web-series-one-world-launches-december-1-2021

https://popwrapped.com/one-world-important-issues-spreading-positivity/

External links 
 https://www.oneworldseries.com/
 https://www.callforpeace.world/
 https://www.imdb.com/name/nm0260634/?ref_=fn_al_nm_1
 
 Golden Films, at IMDb

1990 establishments in the United States
American film studios